Ko Lau Wan aka. Kau Lau Wan is a remote village in the north of Sai Kung Peninsula, Hong Kong. Administratively, it is under the jurisdiction of Tai Po District.

Administration
Kau Lau Wan is a recognised village under the New Territories Small House Policy.

Geography
Together with nearby Tan Ka Wan, Ko Lau Wan forms an enclave within Sai Kung East Country Park.

Features
A Tin Hau Temple is located in the village.

In fiction
The 2005 French film La Moustache was partially filmed in Ko Lau Wan.

Transport
There is no road for vehicles to head to Ko Lau Wan. The area can be accessed by kai-to ferries from Ma Liu Shui or Wong Shek Pier. There is also a hiking path from Pak Tam Au which normally takes about 5 hours for hikers to pass through.

References

Further reading

External links

 Delineation of area of existing village Ko Lau Wan (Sai Kung North) for election of resident representative (2019 to 2022)
 Picture of the Tin Hau Temple of Ko Lau Wan:  

Villages in Tai Po District, Hong Kong
Sai Kung North